Darren Scott Ríos (born October 14, 1995) is a professional footballer who plays as a midfielder for National Independent Soccer Association club Michigan Stars and the Puerto Rico national team.

Early life
Ríos started at local side West Pine United and the U.S. Soccer Developmental Academy in Weston while also studying at Archbishop Edward A. McCarthy High School, which he joined in 2009. He spent time on trial at Colombian side Bogotá F.C. in 2011, and was named in the 2012 Broward-County team.

College career
Having graduated from McCarthy High in 2013 with honors in anatomy and physiology, Ríos left the Weston-based development camp and enrolled at the Florida International University, where he joined the university's soccer team, The Panthers.

International career
Ríos made his international debut for Puerto Rico in their first ever international game against the United States in 2016.

Career statistics

Club

Notes

International

References

External links
 K-W United statistics at US PDL
 Miami City statistics at US PDL

1995 births
Living people
Puerto Rican footballers
Puerto Rican expatriate footballers
Puerto Rico international footballers
American soccer players
American expatriate soccer players
American sportspeople of Puerto Rican descent
Association football midfielders
FIU Panthers men's soccer players
K-W United FC players
FC Miami City players
Sportspeople from Fort Lauderdale, Florida
Soccer players from Florida
USL League Two players
Puerto Rican expatriate sportspeople in Spain
American expatriate sportspeople in Spain
Expatriate footballers in Spain
American expatriate sportspeople in Bolivia
Expatriate footballers in Bolivia